The 2016 Morocco Tennis Tour – Kenitra was a professional tennis tournament played on clay courts. It was the 4th edition of the tournament which was part of the 2016 ATP Challenger Tour. It took place in Kenitra, Morocco between 19 and 24 September.

Singles main-draw entrants

Seeds

 1 Rankings are as of September 12, 2016.

Other entrants
The following players received wildcards into the singles main draw:
  Amine Ahouda
  Yassine Idmbarek
  Mehdi Jdi
  Pablo Andújar

The following players received entry from the qualifying draw:
  Kevin Krawietz
  Lamine Ouahab
  Alexander Zhurbin
  Pol Toledo Bagué

The following player received entry as a lucky loser:
  Omar Salman

Champions

Singles

 Maximilian Marterer def.   Mohamed Safwat, 6–2, 6–4.

Doubles

 Kevin Krawietz /  Maximilian Marterer def.  Uladimir Ignatik / , Michael Linzer 7–6(8–6), 4–6, [10–6].

External links
 Official website

Morocco Tennis Tour - Kenitra
2016 Morocco Tennis Tour
Morocco Tennis Tour – Kenitra